

Preschools

St. Kitts
 Diligent Hands Child Care Center 
 Kebabies Child Development Centre

Primary schools

St. Kitts
Christ Church Nichola Town
 Estridge Primary School
 Joshua Obadiah Williams Primary School (Molineux Primary School)

Saint Anne Sandy Point
 Sandy Point Primary School

Saint George Basseterre
 Beach Allen Primary School
 Cotton Thomas Comprehensive School
 Dr. William Connor Primary School
 George Moody Stuart School (Private)
 Irishtown Primary School
 Maurice Hillier Memorial Junior School (Private)-Methodist
 St. Kitts International Academy (SKI Academy - Private School) Grades 1 - high school. (formerly - Montessori Academy (Private))
 Immaculate Conception Catholic School(Private)-Catholic formerly Saint Theresa's Convent School (Private) & Saint Joseph's Primary School (Private)
 St. Kitts Seventh-Day Adventist Primary School (Private)
 Tucker Clarke Primary School
 St. Christopher's Preparatory School (Private)

Saint John Capesterre
 Dieppe Bay Primary School
 Edgar T Morris Primary School (Tabernacle)
 Saddlers Primary School

Saint Mary Cayon
 Cayon Primary School
 Violet Petty Primary School (Lodge Project)

Saint Paul Capisterre
 Newton Ground Primary School
 St. Pauls Primary School

Saint Peter Basseterre
 Dean Glasford Primary School

Saint Thomas Middle Island
 Tyrell Williams Primary School

Trinity Palmetto Point
 Bronte Welsh Primary School

Nevis
 Nevis Academy (formerly Bellevue International Primary School)
 Charlestown Primary School
 Ivor Walters Primary School (formerly Prospect Primary School) - De Metropolis
 Joycelyn Liburd Primary School (formerly Gingerland Primary School)
 Maude Crosse Preparatory School (formerly Charlestown Preparatory School)(Private)
 St. James Primary School
 Elizabeth Pemberton Primary School (formerly St. Johns Primary School)
 St. Thomas'/Lowlands Primary School
 Violet O Jeffers-Nicholls Primary School (Combermere Primary School)
 Montessori Academy Nevis(Private)
 Cecele Browne Integrated School (Special Education Unit)

Secondary schools

St. Kitts

1st-5th form (Similar to British System of education)
 Cayon High School
 Washington Archibald High School
 Verchilds High School
 Charles E. Mills Secondary School(CEMSS)  formerly Sandy Point High School
 Saddlers Secondary School 
 Basseterre High School
 (ICCS) Immaculate Conception Catholic School (Private) formerly St. Theresa's Convent High School (Private)-Catholic
 (Ski Academy) St. Kitts International Academy (Private)
 St. Christopher Preparatory School

Nevis

 Charlestown Secondary School
 Gingerland Secondary School
 (NISS) Nevis International Secondary School (Private)

Higher education

 International University of the Health Sciences
 Ross University School of Veterinary Medicine
 Robert Ross International University of Nursing
 University of Medicine and Health Sciences
 Windsor University School of Medicine
 University of the West Indies
 Medical University of the Americas

References

 
Saint Kitts and Nevis
Schools
Schools
Saint Kitts and Nevis